Vanadium(III) bromide, also known as vanadium tribromide, is the inorganic compound with the formula VBr3.  It is a green-black solid.  In terms of its structure, the compound is polymeric with octahedral vanadium(III) surrounded by six bromide ligands.

VBr3 has been prepared by treatment of vanadium tetrachloride with hydrogen bromide:
2 VCl4  + 8 HBr  →  2 VBr3  +  8 HCl  +  Br2
The  reaction proceeds via the unstable vanadium(IV) bromide (VBr4), which releases Br2 near room temperature.

Like VCl3, VBr3 forms red-brown soluble complexes with dimethoxyethane and THF, such as mer-VBr3(THF)3.

Aqueous solutions prepared from  VBr3 contain the cation trans-[VBr2(H2O)4]+.  Evaporation of these solutions give the salt trans-[VBr2(H2O)4]Br.

Further reading
Stebler, A.; Leuenberger, B.; Guedel, H. U.  "Synthesis and crystal growth of A3M2X9 (A = Cs, Rb; M = Ti, V, Cr; X = Cl, Br)"    Inorganic Syntheses  (1989),  volume 26, pages 377–85.

References

Bromides
Metal halides
Vanadium(III) compounds